Motorpsycho is a Norwegian rock band from Trondheim. Their music can generally be defined as progressive or psychedelic rock, but they also mix in elements from alternative, jazz, post-rock, pop, country and many other musical styles. The members of the band are Bent Sæther (born 18 February 1969, bass/vocals), Hans Magnus "Snah" Ryan (born 31 December 1969, guitar/vocals) and Tomas Järmyr (drums). Until March 2005, Håkon Gebhardt (born 21 June 1969) was the band's drummer. From December 2007 to May 2016 Kenneth Kapstad was the drummer of the band, being replaced by Tomas Järmyr, who joined in early 2017. Järmyr left the band in January 2023.

Biography 
Formed in the late 1980s as an alternative metal band (they picked their name after seeing the Russ Meyer film of the same name as part of a Russ Meyer triple bill – there was already a band named after Mudhoney and a band named after Faster, Pussycat! Kill! Kill! – the other two films on the bill), Motorpsycho soon developed a unique blend of grunge, heavy metal and indie rock, as well as incorporating the sonic noise experiments of associated member Deathprod. The hugely ambitious, progressive double album Demon Box (1993) followed a series of low-profile EPs and albums, earning the band a nomination for a Norwegian Grammy, and secured a loyal following in Germany, Italy, Belgium and the Netherlands as well as in Scandinavia.

The 1990s was an extremely productive era for the band, releasing new material almost every year, and enjoying critical acclaim for each album—if not the massive sales the music press kept predicting.

With the 2000 album Let Them Eat Cake, Motorpsycho suddenly took huge steps away from their noisy hard rock roots, opting instead for a smoother, jazz-tinged approach to the songwriting and recording process. They kept this technique for the subsequent releases, Phanerothyme and It's A Love Cult.

The double album Black Hole/Blank Canvas was released 17/20 March 2006 in Europe. The album received great reviews.

On 28 March 2008 Motorpsycho released an album entitled Little Lucid Moments, and on 16 March 2008 a DVD containing music videos, live footage and documentaries entitled Haircuts.

To celebrate their 20th anniversary, the band released a vinyl-only album, Child of the Future, recorded by Steve Albini at the beginning of August 2009.

In January 2010 Motorpsycho released the album Heavy Metal Fruit, their first album featuring an external producer, Kåre Vestrheim, and also their third album in under two years.

In October 2011 the Dutch venue Effenaar released a limited edition live album exclusively on vinyl entitled Strings Of Stroop – Motorpsycho Live At Effenaar. The album features four Motorpsycho tracks recorded during various Motorpsycho shows at Effenaar between 1999 and 2010. Only 500 copies were pressed and sold at the band's 14th show in the venue.

On 10 February 2012 Motorpsycho released the double CD/LP effort The Death Defying Unicorn in collaboration with keyboardist Ståle Storløkken from the free improv group Supersilent. The album is a reworking of an instrumental suite commissioned by and performed at Moldejazz 2010. During 2011, Sæther produced lyrics for a sweeping narrative, thus making the album version a concept album. As in its initial performance, the band and Storløkken are augmented by contributions from Trondheimssolistene, Trondheim Jazz Orchestra and violinist Ola Kvernberg. The core quartet performed the album in its entirety on every date during a March/April 2012 tour of Europe.

After the release and tour accompanying the Unicorn, the band felt the need to return to more traditional, guitar-based grounds and with Reine Fiske as second guitarist, recorded two albums, Still Life With Eggplant (released in spring 2013) and Behind the Sun (released in March 2014). To coincide with the release of Behind the Sun, Motorpsycho launched their first-ever official website, www.motorpsycho.no.

After years of institutionalising the band in Norway, Motorpsycho were inducted at Rockheim, Norway's rock music hall of fame, in a TV broadcast ceremony.

In 2016 the band released the studio album Here Be Monsters, which evolved from a piece of music they wrote for the Oslo Teknisk Museums birthday. The band played that special songs in the museum, with the help of Ståle Storløkken, and then decided to work on it in the studio.

In May 2016, after completing the European Here Be Monsters Tour, Kenneth Kapstad left Motorpsycho. Core members Sæther and Ryan spent the remainder of the year writing, rehearsing and performing a live score to the Carl Frode Tiller-written play Begynnnelser (eng. Beginnings) in a 38-date autumn run at Trøndelag Teater.

In a January 2, 2017, news update on their official home page, the band announced Swedish drummer Tomas Järmyr to be the third permanent member of Motorpsycho. Together, they have recorded The Tower in Los Angeles and Joshua Tree (at the famous recording studio, Rancho de la Luna), which was released on September 8 the same year.

On January 8, 2023, Järmyr left the band.

Line up

Current line up 
Bent Sæther – lead vocals, bass, guitars, keyboards, drums (since 1989)
Hans Magnus "Snah" Ryan – lead guitars, vocals, keyboards, mandolin, violin, bass (since 1989)

Previous members 
Kjell Runar "Killer" Jenssen – drums (1989–1991)
Håkon Gebhardt – drums, vocals, banjo, guitar (1991–2005)
Helge "Deathprod" Sten – theremin, various electronics, audio virus (1992–1994; frequent guest and producer 1994–2002, 2007, 2015, 2019)
Lars Lien – keyboards, vocals (1993–1996, 2004; infrequent guest)
Morten "Lolly" Fagervik – drums, rhythm guitar, keyboards (1994–1996)
Kenneth Kapstad – drums, keyboards, vocals (2007–2016)
Tomas Järmyr – drums (2017–2023)

Major collaborators 
Matt Burt – voice, poetry (1993, 1996)
Kjell Karlsen – steel guitar, vocals (1994, 2004) 
Øyvind Brandtsegg – Marimba Lumina and ImproSculpt programming (1994; live, 2006)
Ole Henrik "Ohm" Moe – violin, saw, piano (1996–2000, 2013)
Baard Slagsvold – keyboards, vocals (1999–2003)
Jacco van Rooij – drums (live, 2006)
Pekka Stokke – visuals (live, 2006—)
Ståle Storløkken – keyboards (2010–2012, 2014)
Reine Fiske – guitar, keyboards (2012–2014, 2018— )
Ola Kvernberg – violin (2012–2013, 2018—)
Kristoffer Lo – keyboards, trumpet (2017— )
Lars Horntveth – guitar, flute, keyboards (2001, 2018— )
Ole Paus – guitar, vocals (2019— )
TrondheimSolistene
Trondheim Jazzorkester

Timeline

Honors

Spellemannsprisen 

Spellemannprisen is often referred to as the Norwegian Grammy Awards in English. It is a Norwegian music award presented to Norwegian musicians.

As of 2020, Motorpsycho have received 14 nominations, with four wins.

Spellemannprisen 1993 nominated in the class Rock, for the album Demon Box
Spellemannprisen 1994 in the class Best album cover, for the album Timothy's Monster created by Kim Hiorthøy
Spellemannprisen 1996 in the class Rock, for the album Blissard
Spellemannprisen 1997 in the class Hard rock, for the album Angels and Daemons at Play
Spellemannprisen 2000 in the class Rock, for the album Let Them Eat Cake
Spellemannprisen 2001 nominated in the class Rock, for the album Phanerothyme
Spellemannprisen 2003 nominated in the class Åpen klasse, for the album In The Fishtank (With Jaga Jazzist Horns). 
Spellemannprisen 2008 nominated in the class Rock, for the album Little Lucid Moments 
Spellemannprisen 2009 nominated in the class Rock, for the album Child of the Future
Spellemannprisen 2010 nominated in the class Rock, for the album Heavy Metal Fruit
Spellemannprisen 2012 nominated in the class Rock, for the album The Death-Defying Unicorn
Spellemannprisen 2013 nominated in the class Rock, for the album Still Life With Eggplant
Spellemannprisen 2017 nominated in the class Rock, for the album The Tower
Spellemannprisen 2020 nominated in the class Rock, for the album The All Is One

Other 
1999: Gammleng Award in the class Pop/Rock
2001: Alarm Award in the class Rock for the album Let Them Eat Cake
2010: Edvard Prize for the album Child of the Future
2012: Trondheim Municipality Cultur Prize
2015: Nord-Trøndelag County Cultur Prize
2017: Rockheim Hall of Fame inductees

Discography

Albums

As Motorpsycho & Friends

As Motorpsycho & Ståle Storløkken

As The International Tussler Society 

2004: "Satans Favourite Son" (Promo-single)
2004: "Laila Lou" (Promo-single)

Live albums

Collaborations

Compilations

EPs

Singles
1992: 3 Songs for Rut
1996: Sinful, Windborne
2001: The Slow Phaseout (Promo single)
2001: Go To California (Promo single)
2006: Hyena (Promo-single)
2010: X-3 
2010: The Visitant
2014: Toys (Included with select copies of August edition of Trondheim magazine "Gatemagasinet Sorgenfri")
2015: Psychonaut/Toys
2016: Spin, Spin, Spin
2020: X-mastime Is Here! 
2021: Ulv! Ulv!

Singles and music videos
 Have Fun (1992)
 Sheer Profundity (1993)
 Nothing To Say (1993)
 Another Ugly Tune (1994)
 Wearing Yr Smell (1994)
 Feel (1994)
 Now It's Time To Skate (1994)
 Watersound (1994)
 Mad Sun (1996)
 Manmower (1996)
 Sinful, Wind-Borne (1996)
 The Nerve Tattoo (1996)
 Starmelt/Lovelight (1997)
 Hey, Jane (1998)
 The Other Fool (2000)
 Walkin' With J (2000)
 Go To California (2000)
 The Slow Phaseout (2001)
 Serpentine (2002)
 Victim of Rock (2014)
 On a Plate (2014)
 Spin, Spin, Spin (2016)
 Intrepid Explorer (2018)

See also 

The International Tussler Society
Deathprod
Jaga Jazzist

References

External links 
Official Motorpsycho website (since 11-02-2014)
Motorpsycho fansite in English with lyrics, tabs, biography, links and general information
Motorpsycho MySpace

 
Norwegian hard rock musical groups
Norwegian progressive rock groups
Norwegian alternative rock groups
Norwegian psychedelic rock music groups
Norwegian rock music groups
Spellemannprisen winners
Musical groups established in 1989
1989 establishments in Norway
Musical groups from Trondheim
Harvest Records artists
Rune Grammofon artists